Earl of Leicester is a title that has been created seven times. The first title was granted during the 12th century in the Peerage of England. The current title is in the Peerage of the United Kingdom and was created in 1837.

Early creations

The title was first created for Robert de Beaumont (also spelt de Bellomont), but he nearly always used his French title of Count of Meulan. Three generations of his descendants, all also named Robert, called themselves Earls of Leicester. The Beaumont male line ended with the death of the 4th Earl. His property was split between his two sisters, with Simon IV de Montfort, the son of the eldest sister, acquiring Leicester and the rights to the earldom. (The husband of the younger daughter, Saer de Quincy, was created Earl of Winchester.) However, Simon IV de Montfort was never formally recognized as earl, due to the antipathy between France and England at that time. His second son, Simon V de Montfort, did succeed in taking possession of the earldom and its associated properties. He is the Simon de Montfort who became so prominent during the reign of Henry III. He was killed at the Battle of Evesham in 1265, and his lands and titles were forfeited.

In 1267 the title was created a second time and granted to the king's youngest son, Edmund Crouchback. In 1276 he also became Earl of Lancaster, and the titles became united. Crouchback's son Thomas lost the earldom when he was executed for treason in 1322, but a few years later, it was restored to his younger brother Henry. Henry's son Henry of Grosmont left only two daughters, and his estate was divided between them, the eldest daughter Matilda receiving the earldom, which was held by her husband William V of Holland. (The two passages of the earldom via females illustrate the medieval practice by which such inheritance was allowed in the absence of male heirs.) Matilda, however, soon died, and the title passed to John of Gaunt, husband of her younger sister, Blanche, who was later created Duke of Lancaster. Both the dukedom and the earldom were inherited by John of Gaunt's son, Henry Bolingbroke, and both titles ceased to exist when Henry usurped the throne, as the titles "merged into the crown". (The peers are vassals to the Sovereign, and no one can be a vassal to himself.) The properties associated with the earldom became part of what was later called the Duchy of Lancaster.

In 1564 the earldom was again created for Queen Elizabeth I's favourite, Robert Dudley. Since Dudley died without heirs, the title became extinct at his death. The title was again created in 1618 for Robert Sidney (Baron Sydney), his nephew. Prior to being granted the earldom, Robert Sidney was granted the subsidiary title of Viscount Lisle on 4 May 1605. The Sidneys retained the titles until the death of the seventh Earl in 1743, when the titles again became extinct. The title of earl was then recreated for Thomas Coke (pronounced "Cook"), but it became extinct when he, too, died without heirs.

1784 creation
The title was again bestowed upon George Townshend, 17th Baron Ferrers of Chartley and 8th Baron Compton, eldest son and heir apparent of George Townshend, 4th Viscount Townshend, later the first Marquess Townshend. Townshend was a female-line great-great-great-grandson of Lady Lucy Sydney, daughter of the second Earl of the 1618 creation. The earldom became extinct yet again upon the death of his son, the third Marquess and second Earl, in 1855 (the marquessate was passed on to a cousin and is extant).

1744 and 1837 creations
The Coke family is descended from the noted judge and politician Sir Edward Coke, Lord Chief Justice from 1613 to 1616. Through his son Henry Coke, his great-great-great-grandson Thomas Coke was a landowner, politician and patron of arts. In 1728 he was raised to the Peerage of Great Britain as Baron Lovel, of Minster Lovel in the County of Oxford, and in 1744 he was created Viscount Coke, of Holkham in the County of Norfolk, and Earl of Leicester, also in the Peerage of Great Britain. Lord Leicester began the construction of Holkham Hall in Norfolk. He married Lady Margaret Tufton, 19th Baroness de Clifford (1700—1775) (see the Baron de Clifford for earlier history of this title). Their only child Edward Coke, Viscount Coke, predeceased both his parents, without issue. Consequently, Lord Leicester's titles became extinct on his death in 1759 while the barony of de Clifford fell into abeyance on Lady de Clifford's death in 1775.

The Coke estates were passed on to the late Earl's nephew Wenman Coke. Born Wenman Roberts, he was the son of Philip Roberts and Anne, sister of Lord Leicester, and assumed the surname of Coke in lieu of Roberts. His son Thomas Coke was a politician and noted agriculturalist. Known as "Coke of Norfolk", he sat as a Member of Parliament for many years but is best remembered for his interest in agricultural improvements and is seen as one of the instigators of the British Agricultural Revolution. In 1837 the titles held by his great-uncle were revived when Coke was raised to the Peerage of the United Kingdom as Viscount Coke and Earl of Leicester, of Holkham in the County of Norfolk. This was despite the fact that the 1784 creation of the earldom held by the Townshend family was then still extant (then "usurped" by John Dunn-Gardner), hence the territorial designation "of Holkham". Lord Leicester was succeeded by his eldest son from his second marriage, the second Earl. He served as Lord-Lieutenant of Norfolk for sixty years and was made a Knight of the Garter in 1873.
 
On his death in 1909 the titles passed to his eldest son, the third Earl. He was a colonel in the 2nd Battalion of the Scots Guards and also served as Lord-Lieutenant of Norfolk. He was succeeded by his eldest son, the fourth Earl in 1944. He was also Lord-Lieutenant of Norfolk. His younger son, David Arthur Coke was a friend of the author Roald Dahl but was killed in action during the second world war in December 1941. When he (fourth Earl) died the titles passed to his eldest son, the fifth Earl, in 1949. He was an Extra Equerry to both George VI and Elizabeth II. He died without male issue and was succeeded by his first cousin, the sixth Earl in 1976. He was the son of the Hon. Arthur George Coke, second son of the third Earl. Upon his death in 1994, his son became the 7th Earl of Leicester.  the titles are held by his son Thomas Edward Coke, the eighth Earl, who succeeded in that year.

The family seat is Holkham Hall, near Wells-next-the-Sea, Norfolk. The traditional burial place of the Coke family is a plot situated on the south side of the churchyard of the Holkham parish church of St Withburga. A family mausoleum was built in the same churchyard in the 1870s, but was later abandoned. Many members of the Coke family during the post-medieval period were also buried in St. Mary's Church, Tittleshall.

List of Earls of Leicester

First creation (1107)

Robert de Beaumont, 1st Earl of Leicester (died 1118)
Robert de Beaumont, 2nd Earl of Leicester (1104–1168)
Robert de Beaumont, 3rd Earl of Leicester (died 1190)
Robert de Beaumont, 4th Earl of Leicester (died 1204) (alias Robert FitzPernel)
Amice, Countess of Leicester (died 1215)
Simon de Montfort, 5th Earl of Leicester (c. 1170–1218, confirmed 1207)
Simon de Montfort, 6th Earl of Leicester (1208–1265, forfeit 1265)

Second creation (1267)
Edmund Crouchback, 1st Earl of Leicester and Lancaster (1245–1296)
Thomas, 2nd Earl of Leicester and Lancaster (c. 1280–1322, forfeit 1322)
Henry, 3rd Earl of Leicester and Lancaster (c. 1281–1345) (restored as Earl of Leicester in 1324 and as Earl of Lancaster in 1327)
Henry of Grosmont, Duke of Lancaster, 4th Earl of Leicester (c. 1310-1361)
William V of Holland, Earl of Leicester (1330–1389) 1361-62 Earl of Leicester jure uxoris.
John of Gaunt, Duke of Lancaster, Earl of Leicester (1340–1399), in 1362 at first Earl of Leicester jure uxoris.
Henry Bolingbroke, Duke of Lancaster, Earl of Leicester (1367–1413, became king in 1399)

Third creation (1564)
Robert Dudley, 1st Earl of Leicester (1532–1588)

Fourth creation (1618)

Robert Sidney, 1st Earl of Leicester (1563–1626)
Robert Sidney, 2nd Earl of Leicester (1595–1677)
Philip Sidney, 3rd Earl of Leicester (1619–1698)
Robert Sidney, 4th Earl of Leicester (1649–1702)
Philip Sidney, 5th Earl of Leicester (1676–1705)
John Sidney, 6th Earl of Leicester (1680–1737)
Jocelyn Sidney, 7th Earl of Leicester (1682–1743)

Fifth creation (1744)
Thomas Coke, 1st Earl of Leicester (1697–1759)

Sixth creation (1784)
George Townshend, 2nd Marquess Townshend, 1st Earl of Leicester (1753–1811)
George Townshend, 3rd Marquess Townshend, 2nd Earl of Leicester (1778–1855) (courtesy title)

Seventh creation (1837)

Thomas William Coke, 1st Earl of Leicester (1754–1842)
Thomas William Coke, 2nd Earl of Leicester (1822–1909)
Thomas William Coke, 3rd Earl of Leicester (1848–1941)
Thomas William Coke, 4th Earl of Leicester (1880–1949)
Thomas William Edward Coke, 5th Earl of Leicester (1908–1976)
Anthony Louis Lovel Coke, 6th Earl of Leicester (1909–1994)
Edward Douglas Coke, 7th Earl of Leicester (1936–2015)
Thomas Edward Coke, 8th Earl of Leicester (b.1965)

The heir apparent is the 8th Earl's son, Edward Horatio Coke, Viscount Coke (b. 2003).

See also
Mountsorrel, a village close to Leicester and home to the Earl of Leicester in 1151.
Earl of Romney
Marquess Townshend
Baron de Clifford
Coke baronets, a junior branch of the Coke family

References
Citations

Sources

Levi Fox, "The Honor and Earldom of Leicester: Origin and Descent, 1066-1399", English Historical Review, 54 (1939), 385-402
Kidd, Charles, Williamson, David (editors). Debrett's Peerage and Baronetage (1990 edition). New York: St Martin's Press, 1990.

External links
Coke family tree 
Brief History of Holkham House with some family references

Extinct earldoms in the Peerage of England
Extinct earldoms in the Peerage of Great Britain
Earldoms in the Peerage of the United Kingdom
Earl
Earl
 

British and Irish peerages which merged in the Crown
Noble titles created in 1107
Noble titles created in 1265
Noble titles created in 1618
Noble titles created in 1564
Noble titles created in 1744
Noble titles created in 1784
Noble titles created in 1837
Noble titles created for UK MPs
Peerages created for eldest sons of peers